Kakuta is a surname. Notable people with the surname include:

Gaël Kakuta (born 1991), French footballer
Kakuji Kakuta (1890–1944), Japanese admiral during World War II
, Japanese ski jumper
Teruo Kakuta, Japanese manga artist

Japanese-language surnames